Stang is a surname. Notable people with the surname include:

Arnold Stang (1918–2009), American actor
Axel Heiberg Stang (1904–1974), Norwegian landowner and member of Vidkun Quisling's government
Christian Schweigaard Stang (1900–1977), Norwegian linguist and professor
Dorothy Stang (1931–2005), American-born Roman Catholic nun, anti-poverty and environmental activist, and murder victim
Emil Stang (1834–1912), Norwegian jurist and politician
Emil Stang (born 1882), Norwegian jurist, politician and Chief Justice of the Supreme Court of Norway
Fabian Stang (born 1955), mayor of Oslo, Norway
Frederik Stang (1804–1884), first Prime Minister of Norway
Fredrik Stang (1867–1941), Minister of Justice and the Police of Norway and law professor
Georg Stang (1858–1907), Minister of Defence of Norway
Hans Georg Jacob Stang (prime minister) (1830–1907), Prime Minister of Norway
Ivan Stang (born 1953), author and publisher of the first screed of the Church of the SubGenius
Jack Stang (1923–1996), inspiration for writer Mickey Spillane's character Mike Hammer
Jørn L. Stang (born 1959), Norwegian politician
Olaf Stang (1871–1956), Norwegian engineer
Ole A. Stang (1872–1955), Norwegian businessperson and landowner
Ole A. Stang, Jr. (1923–1998), Norwegian businessperson; son of Thomas Stang and grandson of Ole Stang
Oliver Stang (born 1988), German footballer
Peter J. Stang (born 1941), American chemist and professor
Rita Stang (1894–1978), Australian medical practitioner
Theodor Stang (1836–1919), Norwegian engineer
Thomas Stang (1897–1982), Norwegian forester and businessman
William Stang (1854–1907), German-born Roman Catholic bishop

See also
All Platinum Records - Stang was a subsidiary label
Ford Mustang, sometimes used as a slang term
Stang, County Down, a townland in County Down, Northern Ireland
Stang (witchcraft), a staff-like ritual tool used in contemporary witchcraft